Collaborations 3 is album in the series of Collaborations albums by Sukshinder Shinda. Featured in this album are Jazzy B, Diljit Dosanjh, Kamal Khan, Shazia Manzoor, Surinder Shinda, Richa Sharma, Abrar-Ul-Haq and Don Revo. The Album is on MovieBox (UK) Music Waves (Canada) and T-Series (India).

Track listing

PTC Punjabi Music Awards 2015

Won 
Best Non Resident Punjabi Album

References

External links
https://itunes.apple.com/gb/album/collaborations-3/id945425128

2014 albums